"You Remain" is a song performed by French DJ and record producer Kungs, featuring vocals from Ritual. The song was released as a digital download in France on 27 October 2016 as the fourth single from his debut studio album Layers (2016). The song has peaked at number 45 on the French Singles Chart. The song was written by Kungs, Adam Midgley, Tommy Baxter and Gez O'Connel.

Music video
A music video to accompany the release of "You Remain" was first released onto YouTube on 27 October 2016 at a total length of three minutes and forty-five seconds.

Track listing

Chart performance

Release history

References

2016 songs
2016 singles
Kungs songs
Songs written by Kungs